Qarah Kuseh (also Romanized as Qarah Kūseh and Qareh Kūseh) is a village in Bizaki Rural District, Golbajar District, Chenaran County, Razavi Khorasan Province, Iran. At the 2006 census, its population was 298, in 67 families.

References 

Populated places in Chenaran County